Cork County Cricket Club is a cricket club in Cork, Ireland, playing in Division 2 of the Leinster Senior League. A member of the Munster Cricket Union, it is the only club from outside Leinster playing in the Leinster League.

The club was established in 1874. In 2009, it was given permission by the Leinster Cricket Union to compete in the Leinster League from the 2010 season. Promotion to Division 1 was first achieved in 2014.

References

External links
Cork County Cricket Club

Leinster Senior League (cricket) teams
1874 establishments in Ireland
Cricket clubs in Munster
Cricket in County Cork
Sports clubs in County Cork
Cork